Erin Gilreath (born August 11, 1980) is an American hammer thrower.

Her personal best is 73.87 meters, achieved in June 2005 in Carson, California. She attended the University of Florida.

International competitions

See also 

 Florida Gators
 List of University of Florida Olympians

References 
 

1980 births
Living people
Sportspeople from Gainesville, Florida
Track and field athletes from Florida
American female hammer throwers
Olympic track and field athletes of the United States
Athletes (track and field) at the 2004 Summer Olympics
World Athletics Championships athletes for the United States
Florida Gators women's track and field athletes
Female weight throwers